Clint Boling (born May 9, 1989) is a former American football guard who spent his entire eight-year career with the Cincinnati Bengals of the National Football League (NFL). He played college football at Georgia. He was considered one of the top guard prospects for the 2011 NFL Draft.

High school career
Boling played at Chattahoochee High School in Johns Creek, Georgia, where he was named to The Atlanta Journal-Constitution Class AAAAA First-team Offense. He started as a tight end his sophomore year before moving to offensive line and defensive end his junior and senior years; he led his team to the playoffs his senior season. He also started for the basketball team. In 2006, he was named to the school's Gridiron Hall of Fame.

College career
The Alpharetta native played at UGA from 2007-2010 where he was all-SEC three times and a freshman all-American. Boling finished his career with 49 career starts at right tackle, right guard and left tackle. As a senior in 2010, he was named an All-American by Pro Football Weekly. He was named All-SEC First-team by the SEC coaches and second-team by the Associated Press. He was selected to play in the annual Senior Bowl. He majored in Risk Management and Insurance.

Professional career
Boling was selected by the Cincinnati Bengals with the 101st overall pick in the 2011 NFL Draft. He played in five games with three starts his rookie year before earning the starting job the following season.

Boling signed a 5-year, $26 million contract extension with the Bengals on March 10, 2015.

Boling was placed on injured reserve on December 26, 2016, after dealing with a separated shoulder since Week 4.

Since his second year as a pro in 2012, Boling has started every game he's played in for the Bengals, 106 consecutive games through the 2018 season.

On July 15, 2019, Boling announced his retirement from the NFL after eight seasons. He was the team's starting left guard from 2012-2018 and appeared in 114 career games (including playoffs) with 112 starts.

Personal life
Boling is the son of Jay and Debbie Boling. He married his wife, Kelly (Lewis), in 2015. They met at the University of Georgia. They have an 80-pound chocolate lab named Mac.

References

External links
 
 Cincinnati Bengals bio
 Georgia Bulldogs bio

1989 births
Living people
American football offensive guards
American football offensive tackles
Cincinnati Bengals players
Georgia Bulldogs football players
People from Alpharetta, Georgia
Players of American football from Georgia (U.S. state)
Sportspeople from Fulton County, Georgia